Dreadnoughts are a type of fictional robot appearing in American comic books published by Marvel Comics. Frequently employed by villainous organizations, different forms are depicted within said organizations. The robots first appeared in Strange Tales #154 (March 1967).

Fictional character biography
The Dreadnought is a non-sentient robotic combat instrument originally created by the subversive Hydra organization for use in various commando operations. The Dreadnought was first used to breach the S.H.I.E.L.D. Helicarrier to attempt to assassinate Nick Fury.

Later, the design and specifications were sold to the Maggia criminal cartel who built the Silver Dreadnought.

Some time later, Advanced Idea Mechanics designed the Dreadnought 2000, stored at Target Technologies in Rutherford, New Jersey.

A rebuilt version was used years later during an attack to destroy London, where the robot had to fight Union Jack.

Zeke Stane later built some new models which were used by the Mandarin to attack the Three Gorges Dam in China.

During the "Iron Man 2020" event, some Dreadnoughts appear as members of the A.I. Army.

Powers and abilities
The original model was designed by Hydra and the Silver Dreadnought was built by the Maggia. Its robotic materials, design and construction from a titanium steel alloy give the Dreadnought superhuman strength, stamina, durability, and reflexes. It has limited artificial intelligence, and no capacity for self-motivated activity. It's programmed for hand-to-hand combat in the style of an American boxer and for combat uses of its built-in weapons subsystems.

Both major models' gauntlets have flamethrower nozzles, capable of firing a hydrazine-liquid oxygen mix. Its knuckles are studded with spikes which can be shot like rifle bullets. From the modules mounted like ears, the Dreadnought generates a powerful electrical charge which conducts throughout its body's frame and through conducting material. The Dreadnought has no capability for projecting this electricity, but is capable of electrifying by touch. The Dreadnought's optical imaging sensor eyes are gamma ray particle beam projectors which can irradiate a target. The Dreadnought’s mouth is connected to a tank of refrigerated Freon gas which allows the Dreadnought a single-use attack of freezing breath.

The Dreadnought 2000 designed by A.I.M. has gauntlet projectors firing high pressure jets of either water, liquid oxygen, acid, oil, powerful adhesive, anesthetic gas, and/or napalm, and/or beams capable of liquefying steel or solidifying gases in the air. It also has the eight gunpowder-launched knuckle spikes, body-wide electrical field, gamma ray particle beam projectors in its optical imaging sensors, and refrigerated Freon gas dispenser in the "mouth" cavity of the previous models.

In other media

Television
 The Dreadnoughts appear in The Avengers: Earth's Mightiest Heroes. These versions are robotic drones built by Hydra.
 Several versions of the Dreadnoughts appear in Avengers Assemble. In the episode "The Final Showdown", the Iron Skull used an army via the Cosmic Cube. In the episode "Crack in the System", Hammer Industries builds a series of modern Dreadnoughts for Justin Hammer, before Ultron uses them to attack the Avengers. In the episode "Secret Avengers", Hydra uses old-fashioned Dreadnoughts as security before they are destroyed by the eponymous group. In the episode "Why I Hate Halloween", Whitney Frost uses her own personal Dreadnoughts as security before they are destroyed by Hawkeye.

Video games
 The Dreadnoughts appear in Spider-Man: Web of Fire.
 The Dreadnoughts appear in the Iron Man film tie-in game.
 The Dreadnoughts appear in Marvel Heroes.

References

External links
 Dreadnought at MarvelDirectory.com

Characters created by Jim Steranko
Characters created by Roy Thomas
Comics characters introduced in 1967
Marvel Comics characters with superhuman strength
Marvel Comics robots
Marvel Comics supervillains